The Kowloon Central Cluster is one of the seven hospital clusters managed by Hospital Authority in Hong Kong. It consists of four public hospitals, two institutions and six general outpatient clinics to provide public healthcare services for the population of Yau Ma Tei, Mong Kok, Tsim Sha Tsui and Kowloon City and Wong Tai Sin. In mid-2012, the population was 1,103,200. The current Cluster Chief Executive is Albert Lo Chi-yuen.

Services
Kowloon Central Cluster operates the following nine hospitals of various capabilities to provide a range of acute, convalescent, rehabilitation, and infirmary inpatient and ambulatory care services to the public in the areas of Yau Ma Tei, Tsim Sha Tsui and Kowloon City. In mid-2012, the population of the areas was 503,200.
Kai Tak Hospital
Kwong Wah Hospital
Our Lady of Maryknoll Hospital
Tung Wah Group of Hospitals Wong Tai Sin Hospital
Hong Kong Buddhist Hospital
Hong Kong Eye Hospital
Kowloon Hospital
Queen Elizabeth Hospital
Hong Kong Children's Hospital

Kowloon Central Cluster also operates the following two institutions:
Hong Kong Red Cross Blood Transfusion Service
Rehabaid Centre

There are also six general outpatient clinics in the cluster:
Central Kowloon Health Centre
Lee Kee Memorial Dispensary
General outpatient clinic at Hong Kong Buddhist Hospital
Hung Hom Clinic
Shun Tak Fraternal Association Leung Kau Kui Clinic
Yau Ma Tei Jockey Club General Outpatient Clinic

, the cluster has 3,547 beds, including 3,004 for acute, convalescent and rehabilitation care, 118 for infirmary care and 425 for psychiatric care; and served by 8,898 full-time equivalent staff.

References

External links 

 

Hospital Authority